Scrub Ridge is a ridge in New Madrid County in the U.S. state of Missouri.

Scrub Ridge was so named on account of shrub trees on it.

References

Landforms of New Madrid County, Missouri
Ridges of Missouri